Y Cygni is an eclipsing and double-lined spectroscopic binary star system in the constellation of Cygnus. The system was one of the first binaries with a convincing detection of the apsidal precession.

The two stars, being O-type main-sequence stars, orbit each other with a period of nearly 3 days.

Observation history
The early type of Y Cyg made it a popular target for astronomers in the past, and spectroscopic orbits have been historically computed numerous times. The first of these studies was published in 1920 by John Stanley Plaskett. Extensive spectroscopic studies of Y Cyg were carried out as early as 1930. Several follow-ups to these have been published in 1959, 1971, and 1980. The latter of these contained an estimate of the period of apsidal precession.

References

Cygnus (constellation)
Binary stars
Objects with variable star designations
198846
102999
O-type main-sequence stars
Algol variables